Lalganj Assembly constituency is an assembly constituency in Vaishali district in the Indian state of Bihar.

Overview
Since 2008, the Lalganj Assembly constituency comprises Lalganj and Bhagwanpur.zedar community development blocks. It is part of No. 21 Hajipur (Lok Sabha constituency) (SC).

Members of Legislative Assembly

Election results

2020

References

External links
 

Assembly constituencies of Bihar
Politics of Vaishali district